Steve Sowden (born, 14 February 1983), is an Australian Pentecostal worship leader and singer in the Planetshakers band.

Biography

Steve grew up in a Christian home and later joined a church worship team as a teenager. Where he studied singing and earned a BA in Musical Theater from the Central Queensland Conservatory of Music in Australia. Throughout his singing career. Sowden was lead vocalist in Tokyo Disney-Sea Broadway Revue 'Encore' from 2005 through 2006. The following year he joined the Ten Tenors group as lead vocalist in internationally acclaimed crossover vocal group from 2006 to 2010. From 2008 until now he belongs to Planetshakers Church, where he serves as a pastor and singer.

Personal life
Steve Sowden married on 4 January 2009 to Katie and together they have four children: Jonathan, Sophia, Eleanor and Joshua.

Discography

The Ten Tenors 

 2006 – Here's to the Heroes No. 8 AUS
 2008 – Nostalgica No. 27 AUS
 2009 – Amigos Para Siempre

Planetshakers 

 2011 – Nothing Is Impossible (August 2011)
 2012 – Heal Our Land (live, April 2012)
 2013 – Limitless (live, January 2013)
 2014 – Endless Praise: Live (live, March 2014) (also a deluxe edition)
 2014 – Nada Es Imposible (in Spanish, July 2014)
 2014 – This Is Our Time: Live (live, October 2014) (also a deluxe edition)
 2015 – Outback Worship Sessions (May 2015)
 2015 – #LETSGO (live, September 2015) (also a deluxe edition)
 2016 – Momentum (Live in Manila) (March 2016)
 2016 – Overflow: Live (live, September 2016) (also a deluxe edition)
 2016 – Sé Quién Eres Tú (in Spanish, November 2016)
 2017 – Legacy (live, September 2017) (also a deluxe edition)
 2017 – Legado (in Spanish, November 2017)
 2018 – Heaven on Earth (live, October 2018) (also a deluxe edition)
 2019 – Rain (live, September 2019)
 2019 – It's Christmas (November 2019)
 2020 – Over It All (November 2020)
 2020 – It's Christmas Live (November 2020)

References

Singers from Melbourne
Planetshakers Church
Planetshakers members
21st-century Australian male singers
21st-century Christians
Australian gospel singers
Australian Pentecostals
Performers of contemporary worship music
Australian Charismatics
1983 births
Living people